Antonio Dionisio Lussich (March 23, 1848 in Montevideo – June 5, 1928 in Punta del Este) was an Uruguayan sailor, arboricultorist and writer.

Family background

His father was Filip Lukšić, a Croatian Merchant sailor who arrived in Montevideo, Uruguay in 1840.

Writings

He was notably the author of ´Los tres gauchos orientales´, depicting rural life in 19th century Uruguay. He was also responsible for other writings of a more maritime theme.

Political associations

In his youth Lussich fought as a supporter of Timoteo Aparicio, a Blanco leader in the intermittent 19th century Uruguayan Civil War ("Blanco" refers to "Partido Blanco", which is Spanish for "White Party").

Lussich later established quite cordial relations with Uruguay's Colorado Party leaders, receiving Colorado Presidents Claudio Wílliman and Baltasar Brum as guests at Punta Ballena ("Colorado" refers to "Partido Colorado", which is Spanish for "Red Party).

Arboretum

On 5 October 1896 he acquired  of uninhabited land at Punta Ballena. At this location he started his masterpiece, the creation of the Arboretum Lussich, a huge natural botany garden. 

He owned part of his father's maritime rescue enterprise which he sold in 1917 so he could dedicate his full-time to his passion.

Death

He died in 1928 in the city of Punta del Este.

See also

 Arboretum Lussich#History

External links

People from Montevideo
Uruguayan naturalists
Uruguayan botanists
Uruguayan male writers
Uruguayan people of Croatian descent
Uruguayan people of Italian descent
1848 births
1928 deaths